Legacy, A Journal of American Women Writers, is a scholarly journal that focuses on American women's writings from the 17th through the mid-20th century. It is the official journal of the Society for the Study of American Women Writers.

Each issue's articles cover a wide range of topics: examinations of the works of individual authors; genre studies; analyses of race, ethnicity, gender, class, and sexualities in women's literature; and historical and material cultural issues pertinent to women's lives and literary works. 
In addition, Legacy regularly publishes profiles of lesser-known or newly recovered authors, reprints of primary works in all genres, and book reviews covering current scholarship in the field.

Legacy is published twice a year by the University of Nebraska Press and is available online through Project MUSE or through university electronic journal websites.

External links
Legacy website
University of Nebraska Press
Project MUSE

Literary magazines published in the United States
University of Nebraska–Lincoln
Magazines published in Nebraska
Publications established in 1984
Biannual journals